Gymnopilus pulchrifolius is a species of mushroom in the family Hymenogastraceae. It was given its current name by American mycologist Murrill in 1917.

Description

Habitat and distribution
Gymnopilus pulchrifolius grows on decaying hemlock wood. It has been found in the US states of New York, Massachusetts, Minnesota, and Indiana; fruiting between July and September.

See also
List of Gymnopilus species

References

External links
Gymnopilus pulchrifolius at Index Fungorum

pulchrifolius
Fungi of North America
Taxa named by Charles Horton Peck